Church Preen is a civil parish in Shropshire, England.  It contains five listed buildings that are recorded in the National Heritage List for England.  Of these, one is listed at Grade II*, the middle of the three grades, and the others are at Grade II, the lowest grade.  The parish contains the village of Church Preen and the surrounding countryside.  The oldest listed building is the church, which dates back to the 12th century.  The other listed buildings date from the 1870s, around the time when Richard Norman Shaw designed Preen Manor, which was built on the site of a previous monastery.  The manor has since been demolished and replaced by another house, which is not listed, but some structures associated with the manor have survived and are listed.


Key

Buildings

References

Citations

Sources

Lists of buildings and structures in Shropshire